Following is a list of all Article III United States federal judges appointed by President John Quincy Adams during his presidency. In total Adams appointed 12 Article III federal judges, including 1 Justice to the Supreme Court of the United States and 11 judges to the United States district courts.

United States Supreme Court justices

District courts

Notes

References
General

 

Specific

Sources
 Federal Judicial Center

Judicial appointments
Adams, John Quincy